Andrei Viktorovich Smirnov (born 1 January 1980) is a former Russian footballer.

Club career
He made his Russian Football National League debut for FC Khimki on 17 May 2002 in a game against FC Dynamo Saint Petersburg.

External links
 
 

1980 births
Footballers from Moscow
Living people
Russian footballers
FC Dynamo Moscow reserves players
FC Khimki players
FC SKA-Khabarovsk players
FC Ufa players
FC Vityaz Podolsk players
FC Arsenal Tula players
Association football defenders
FC Novokuznetsk players
FC Tekstilshchik Ivanovo players